Helmut Alfons Schlegel  (born 15 May 1943) is a German Franciscan, Catholic priest, meditation instructor, author, librettist and songwriter. He is known for writing new spiritual songs (Neues Geistliches Lied), set to music by various composers.

Career 

Born Helmut Alfons Schlegel in Riedlingen, he grew up on his parents' farm in Upper Swabia and attended boarding schools of the Franciscans in Riedlingen and in Rottweil. He felt a connection to Francis of Assisi and joined the Franciscan Order. Then he studied philosophy and theology in Monastery Gorheim in Sigmaringen, Monastery Frauenberg in Fulda and Munich and was ordained priest in 1969 in Fulda. An extra-occupational course for meditation and retreat accompanist as well as in meaning-oriented psychology (Logotherapy) complemented his education.

Schlegel worked for ten years in Wiesbaden and in other places as chaplain and as minister for young people (Jugendpfarrer). From 1988 he directed the Franziskanisches Zentrums für Stille und Begegnung (Franciscan centre for silence and meeting) in Hofheim am Taunus. In 1998 he was elected the provincial superior of Thuringian Franciscan province. In this function, he was also for six years the president of the German Franciscan missionaries, organized as Missionszentrale der Franziskaner in Bonn. From 2007 until October 2018, he has directed a centre for Christian meditation and spirituality of the Catholic Diocese of Limburg (Holy Cross - Centre for Christian Meditation and Spirituality (Heilig Kreuz – Zentrum für christliche Meditation und Spiritualität)) at the church Heilig Kreuz in Frankfurt-Bornheim. where worked until June 2019 as a retreat and meditation leader and priestly co-worker. Even after the end of his activity in Bornheim he continues to offer events in the retreat house Hofheim and in cooperation with the Holy Cross – Centre for Christian Meditation and Spirituality.

Schlegel worked also in the diocese's Arbeitskreis Kirchenmusik und Jugendseelsorge im Bistum Limburg, dedicated to new church music for young people. Schlegel wrote the texts for new spiritual songs (Neues Geistliches Lied, NGL), first in collaboration with the composer and church musician Winfried Heurich. Their song "Der Herr wird dich mit seiner Güte segnen" (The Lord will bless you with his goodness), with music by Thomas Gabriel, was acknowledgeded in a worldwide competition in 1983 as the best entry in German. It was included in the Catholic hymnal Gotteslob as GL 452.

Schlegel was from 1998 to 2013 the editor of the Franciscan magazines Wege mit Franziskus and Franziskaner.

On a commission by the Diocese of Limburg, he wrote the text for an oratorio with music by Peter Reulein, Laudato si' – Ein franziskanisches Magnificat, published by the Dehm-Verlag in 2016. He structured the work, based on the Magnificat in Latin, in a prologue and five scenes; he included texts by Francis of Assisi who began the praises of his Canticle of the Sun with "Laudato si'", Clare of Assisi and Pope Francis who wrote the encyclical Laudato si'.

Selected books

Songs, song books, oratorio 
 "Auf zu neuen Horizonten", in Ein Segen sein
 "Der Herr wird dich mit seiner Güte segnen", in Gotteslob
 "Glauben können wie du", melody by Joachim Raabe, GL 885 in Gotteslob Limburg
 "Jesus Christus, Menschensohn", melody by Joachim Raabe, GL 764 in Gotteslob Limburg

Texts for sacred musical plays 

Schlegel wrote the texts for sacred plays with music about the lives of Clare of Assisi and St. Elizabeth.

References

External links 

 
 Helmut Schlegel Carus-Verlag
 Meditationskirche ging an den Start / In der Filialkirche Heilig Kreuz wurde das Zentrum für christliche Meditation und Spiritualität eröffnet (in German) St. Josef, Bornheim 2007
 Viele Berufe, eine Berufung (in German) kirchenzeitung.de 13 March 2016
 hr 2 kultur Morgenfeier am Pfingstsonntag / Tiere – Viecher oder Geschwister? (in German) Broadcast for Pentecost by HR 15 May 2016

20th-century German Roman Catholic priests
21st-century German Roman Catholic priests
German male writers
Christian hymnwriters
Franciscans
1943 births
Living people
People from Riedlingen